Chromophobia is the debut album of Brazilian producer Gui Boratto. It was released in February 2007 on the Kompakt label.  Tracks containing guitar and piano were played by Gui Boratto. All vocals are by Luciana Villanova. It was named the 43rd best album of the decade by Resident Advisor.

Track listing 
All tracks by Gui Boratto except where noted.

"Scene 1" – 3:55
"Mr. Decay" – 6:58
"Terminal" – 5:57
"Gate 7" – 6:41
"Shebang" – 7:28
"Chromophobia" – 7:12
"The Blessing" – 5:40
"Malá Strana" – 2:31
"Acróstico" – 4:25
"Xilo" – 3:55
"Beautiful Life" (Boratto, Luciana Villanova) – 8:31
"Hera" – 3:59
"The Verdict" – 3:37

Personnel 
Gui Boratto – guitar, piano, producer, engineer, mastering, mixing
Luciana Villanova – vocals

References

External links
Chromophobia on Discogs

2007 debut albums
Gui Boratto albums
Kompakt albums